The Foster-Buell Estate is a home located at 2700 E. Hampden Ave. in Cherry Hills Village, Colorado. It is an example of Colonial revival architecture built in 1920. The architects were William Ellsworth Fisher and his brother Arthur Addison Fisher (Fisher & Fisher). The grounds were landscaped by Saco DeBoer. It was first the residence of Alexis C. Foster and then the home of architect Temple Buell.

See also
National Register of Historic Places listings in Arapahoe County, Colorado

References

Houses in Aurora, Colorado
Historic districts on the National Register of Historic Places in Colorado
National Register of Historic Places in Arapahoe County, Colorado